Kondapalli Koteswaramma (August 5, 1918 – September 19, 2018) was an Indian communist leader, feminist, revolutionary, and writer born in 1918 in Pamarru.

Childhood and early life 
She was married to her uncle very young but he died within two years leaving her a child widow at 9. She did her schooling from her hometown besides getting trained in music. At the age of 10 years, she took active part in the freedom struggle by singing patriotic songs in various meetings and congregations. She got remarried at the age of 19 to Kondapalli Seetaramaiah. Initially, she faced many social constraints as widow remarriage was not accepted by the society back then. After marriage, she stayed along with her husband in Jonnapadu for few years. During this time, she worked for the Communist Party in Gudivada. After moving to Vijayawada, she attended various conferences and worked for Women's association.

Work and later life 
She worked actively for the Communist Party of India along with her husband and the likes of Puchapalli Sundaraiah. She contributed actively to the Telangana Rebellion. She worked for the party for few years staying underground (In Bandar, Eluru, Puri, Raichur), away from her family and children. Shortly after the rebellion, the communist party divided into two. Her husband deserted her and she was left to fend for herself and her children.  At the age of 35, she came to Hyderabad to study matriculation. She sustained during those years through the little money earned from writing stories and performing for the radio. Even while sustaining with such meagre earnings, she used to send ten rupees each to the party (CPI and CPI(M)) funds every month. After completing her matriculation, she joined Polytechnic college in Kakinada as a matron. She started participating in the literary events in Kakinada. Later, she worked in various colleges across the state. She had a daughter Karuna and a son Chandrasekhar. Karuna was a doctor and Chandrasekhar studied at Regional Engineering College, Warangal. Both of them died under unforeseen circumstances. During these years, her husband established the People's war party in India and worked actively towards it. But he got ousted later on from his own party and was jailed. He suffered mental illness and died at the age of 87 in his granddaughter's (daughter of Karuna) place. Koteswaramma lived in Vijayawada for few years and later on moved to Chandra Rajewsara Rao Old age home in Hyderabad.

Literary works 
Koteswaramma penned various books, essays and songs to date. The notable ones include Amma Cheppina Aidu Geyalu (1972), Ashru Sameekshanam (1991), Sanghamitra Kathalu (1991). Her autobiography Nirjana Vaaradhi (2012) was published by the Hyderabad Book Trust. It was translated to English as "The Sharp Knife of Memory"  and into other Indian languages.

Other 
She was actively involved in Communist, Naxalbari, Feminist, Freedom and Reformist movements throughout her life. Latterly, she lived in Visakhapatnam along with her granddaughter. She died on September 19, 2018, presumably at the age of 100.

References

Sources
 Nirjana Vaaradhi (lit. Deserted Bridge), Autobiographical memoir of Kondapalli Koteswaramma.

1918 births
2018 deaths
Communist Party of India (Marxist) politicians from Andhra Pradesh
Indian women novelists
People from Krishna district
Novelists from Andhra Pradesh
Telugu-language writers
Telugu women writers
Telugu writers
20th-century Indian novelists
20th-century Indian women writers
20th-century Indian journalists
Indian political writers
Indian women political writers
20th-century Indian essayists
Indian feminist writers
Indian women educational theorists
20th-century Indian educational theorists
Women writers from Andhra Pradesh
Journalists from Andhra Pradesh
Educators from Andhra Pradesh
Women educators from Andhra Pradesh
Indian centenarians
Women centenarians
Deaths from cerebrovascular disease
20th-century women educators